Howling is the eighth studio album by Australian hard rock band The Angels, released in October 1986. The album charted at number 6 in Australia and it peaked at number 10 in New Zealand.

Track listing
Credits adapted from the original LP release.

Personnel
The Angels
Doc Neeson – lead vocals
Rick Brewster – lead guitar, percussion on "Don't Waste My Time"	 	 
Bob Spencer – rhythm guitar, backing vocals
Jim Hilbun – bass guitar, saxophone, backing vocals, organ on "Did You Hurt Somebody", percussion on "Don't Waste My Time" 
Brent Eccles – drums

Additional musicians
Eddie Rayner – keyboards
Swami Brown – percussion on "Don't Waste My Time"
Mary Azzopardi – backing vocals on "Hide Your Face" and "Can't Take Anymore"
Bridget O'Donoghue – backing vocals on "Hide Your Face" and "Can't Take Anymore"
Greg Thorne – trumpet on "Standing over You" and "Don't Waste My Time"
Tony Buchanan – tenor and baritone saxophones on "Standing over You" and "Don't Waste My Time"
Herbie Canon – trombone on "Standing over You" and "Don't Waste My Time"

Production
Steve Brown – producer
Andrew Scott, Al Wright – engineers
Heidi Cannova – assistant engineer
Bill Price – mixing at Wessex Sound Studios, London
Deitmar – mixing assistant

Charts

Weekly charts

Year-end charts

References 

1986 albums
The Angels (Australian band) albums
Mushroom Records albums